Bulworth: The Soundtrack is the soundtrack to Warren Beatty's 1998 film Bulworth. It was released on April 21, 1998 via Interscope Records and consists of hip hop music. The album is composed of fourteen songs and features performances by the likes of B-Real, Canibus, Dr. Dre, Eve, Ice Cube, Kam, KRS-One, LL Cool J, Mack 10, Mýa, Pras, Prodigy, Public Enemy, The Black Eyed Peas, Witchdoctor, Youssou N'Dour, and Wu-Tang Clan's Cappadonna, Method Man, Ol' Dirty Bastard and RZA, among others.

The album peaked at number 10 in the United States, at number 17 in New Zealand, at number 39 in Austria and at number 98 in Germany.

In 2012, Complex placed the album at No. 24 on their 'The 25 Best Hip-Hop Movie Soundtracks Of All Time'.

Track listing

Charts

Weekly charts

Year-end charts

Certifications

References

External links

1998 soundtrack albums
Hip hop soundtracks
Albums produced by RZA
Albums produced by Dr. Dre
Albums produced by Melvin "Mel-Man" Bradford
Albums produced by DJ Muggs
Albums produced by will.i.am
Interscope Records soundtracks
Albums produced by Teddy Riley
Albums produced by Wyclef Jean
Albums produced by Jerry Duplessis
Comedy film soundtracks